Aglaia hiernii is a species of plant in the family Meliaceae. It is found in Indonesia and Malaysia.

References

hiernii
Near threatened plants
Taxonomy articles created by Polbot